Kaushambi district is a district in the state of Uttar Pradesh in India. Manjhanpur is the district headquarters. The district was carved from Allahabad district on 4 April 1997. Manauri Bajar connects Allahabad and Kaushambi districts by railway over a bridge on SH-95. It is surrounded by Chitrakoot district on the south, Pratapgarh district on the north, Allahabad district on the east and Fatehpur district on the west. Kaushambi is part of Allahabad division. The nearest railway station, in Bharwari, connects with Delhi, Allahabad, Kolkata, Gaya and Kanpur.

Mythology and history 

Kaushambi was the capital of the ancient Indian Vatsa Mahajanapada, one of 16 such kingdoms. According to the Puranas, Vatsa was named after a Kāśī king. The Ramayana and the Mahabharata attribute the founding of its capital' Kauśāmbī, to a Chedi prince (Kuśa or Kuśāmba). The Puranas state that after Hastinapur was washed away by the Ganges, the Bharata king Nicakṣu (great-great grandson of Janamejaya), abandoned the city and settled in Kauśāmbī. Both described the king, Udayana, as a scion of the Bhārata family. The Puranas contain a list of Nicakṣu’s successors which ends with the king Kṣemaka. Gautama Buddha visited Kaushambi several times during the reign of Udayana in his effort to spread the dharma, the Noble Eightfold Path and the Four Noble Truths, and Udayana was a Buddhist upāsaka. According to the Chinese translation of the Buddhist canonical text , the first image of the Buddha (carved from sandalwood) was made at Udayana's request. The Puranas state that his four successors were Vahināra, DanḍapāṇI, Niramitra and Kṣemaka. Vatsa was later annexed by Avanti, and Maniprabha (Pradyota's great-grandson) ruled at Kauśāmbī as a prince of Avanti. Ashoka considered Kaushambi important, and placed a pillar there with inscriptions in Pali; a Jain temple was also constructed. The pillar and temple still stand, and Vatsa is being excavated by archaeologists.

Kaushambi district was carved from Allahabad district on 4 April 1997. In 2006, the Ministry of Panchayati Raj named Kaushambi one of India's 250 most backward districts (out of a total of 640). It is one of the 34 districts in Uttar Pradesh receiving funds from the Backward Regions Grant Fund (BRGF).

Demographics

According to the 2011 census, Kaushambi district had a population of 1,599,596, (comparable to the population of Guinea-Bissau and the US state of Idaho); this ranks it 313th of India's 640 districts. Its population growth rate from 2001 to 2011 was 23.49 percent. Kaushambi has a sex ratio of 905 females to 1,000 males, and a literacy rate of 63.69 percent. Scheduled Castes made up 34.72% of the population.

At the time of the 2011 Census of India, 98.57% of the population in the district spoke Hindi and 1.10% Urdu as their first language.

Transportation

Closest Airport to Kaushambi is in Allahabad airport which is 56 kilometers (34.7 miles) away from district headquarters and has flights to major destinations such as Delhi, Bangaluru, Mumbai, Kolkata etc.

Major railway station is in neighboring Allahabad (56 km). Kaushambi district also has several railway stations:
 Sirathu railway station, Sirathu
 Bharwari railway station, Bharwari
 Manauri railway station, Manauri bajar

Sports
Mohamed Aslam was a heavyweight boxer from Bharwari who was a silver medalist at the 1973 and 1975 Asian Amateur Boxing Championships in Bangkok and Yokohama, respectively. Aslam won the Indian national championship in the heavyweight category for five consecutive years (1973–1978).

References

External links
 Official website

 
Districts of Uttar Pradesh